X-75 Volume 1 is the debut album by Henry Threadgill released on the Arista Novus label in 1979.  The album and features four of Threadgill's compositions performed by Threadgill with Douglas Ewart, Joseph Jarman, Wallace McMillan, Leonard Jones, Brian Smith, Rufus Reid, Fred Hopkins and vocals by Amina Claudine Myers. The Allmusic review by Brian Olewnick states, "Henry Threadgill's first album as a leader immediately plunged into experimental waters. He utilized a nonet the likes of which had certainly never been heard before and probably not since... Threadgill's massive talent for mid-size band arrangements is immediately apparent... As of 2002, X-75, Vol. 1 was unreleased on disc and, even more disappointingly, there was never a "Vol. 2." But Threadgill fans looking for a link between Air and his Sextett owe it to themselves to search this one out".

Track listing
All compositions by Henry Threadgill
 "Sir Simpleton" - 6:26  
 "Celebration" - 13:21  
 "Air Song" - 10:21  
 "Fe Fi Fo Fum" - 13:00  
Recorded at CI Recording Studios, New York City on January 13, 1979

Personnel
Henry Threadgill - alto saxophone, flute, bass flute
Douglas Ewart - bass clarinet, piccolo, flute
Joseph Jarman - soprano saxophone, flute
Wallace McMillan - piccolo, alto flute, tenor saxophone
Leonard Jones - bass
Brian Smith - piccolo bass, bass
Rufus Reid - bass
Fred Hopkins - bass
Amina Claudine Myers - vocals

References

1979 debut albums
Henry Threadgill albums
Novus Records albums